These are the Australian Country number-one albums of 2017, per the ARIA Charts.

See also
2017 in music
List of number-one albums of 2017 (Australia)

References

2017
Australia country albums
Number-one country albums